Jérémie Mion (born 5 July 1989) is a French competitive sailor.

He competed at the 2016 Summer Olympics in Rio de Janeiro, in the men's 470 reaching a 7th position.

References

External links 
 
 
 
 
 

1989 births
Living people
French male sailors (sport)
Olympic sailors of France
Sailors at the 2016 Summer Olympics – 470
Sailors at the 2020 Summer Olympics – 470